Henry Warde may refer to:
 Sir Henry Warde (British Army officer, born 1766) (1766–1834), British Army general and colonial governor
 H. M. A. Warde (Henry Murray Ashley Warde, 1850–1940), British Army officer and Chief Constable of Kent

See also
 Henry Ward (disambiguation)